Gyft may refer to:

 Gyft (app), a gift card mobile app and website
 Gyft (rapper)